The 2006 European Sevens Championship was a rugby sevens competition, with the final held in Moscow, Russia. It was the fifth edition of the European Sevens championship. The event was organised by rugby's European governing body, the FIRA – Association of European Rugby (FIRA-AER).
Final:
Portugal, 19 - Russia, 7

Preliminary Rounds

Sopot 7's, Poland (27 / 28 May 2006)

Split 7's, Croatia (27 / 28 May 2006)

Lunel 7's, France (03 / 4 June 2006)

Madrid 7's, Spain (14 June 2006)

First round

Pool A

 22 - 10 
 26 - 00 
 46 - 00 
 54 - 05 
 26 - 00 
 68 - 00 
 55 - 00 
 54 - 00  
 24 - 00 
 63 - 00

Pool B

 35 - 07  
 53 - 00 INVITATION 7's
 43 - 07 
 28 - 14 INVITATION 7's 
 38 - 07 
 24 - 14  INVITATION 7's
 24 - 05 
 24 - 00  
 28 - 07  INVITATION 7's
 31 - 00

Second round

Bowl Semifinals

 50 - 00 
 38 - 07

Cup Semifinals

  19 - 12 
 48 - 00

9th Place

INVITATION 7's 28 - 00

7th Place

 33 - 00

5th Place
 28 - 12

3rd Place

 26 - 07

Cup Final

 17 - 12 

Budapest 7's, Hungary (10 / 11 June 2006)

Tbilisi 7's, Georgia (17 / 18 June 2006)

Final Round

Moscow 7's, Russia  (15 / 16 July 2006)

Final standings

References

External links
 http://www.rugby7.com/st.asp?T=POL-2006
 http://www.rugby7.com/st.asp?T=CRO-2006
 http://www.rugby7.com/st.asp?T=LUN-2006
 http://www.rugby7.com/st.asp?T=MAD-2006
 http://www.rugby7.com/st.asp?T=BUD-2006
 http://www.rugby7.com/st.asp?T=TBL-2006
 http://www.rugby7.com/st.asp?T=MOS-2006

2006
International rugby union competitions hosted by Russia
European
2006–07 in European rugby union
2006 in Russian rugby union